Americans for Financial Reform (AFR) is a progressive nonprofit organization which advocates for financial reform in the United States, including stricter regulation of Wall Street. AFR is a coalition of approximately 200 consumer, labor and special interest groups.

Activities 
The group supported the passage of the Dodd–Frank Wall Street Reform and Consumer Protection Act as well as the creation of the Consumer Financial Protection Bureau. AFR has received funding from the Democracy Alliance.

During the Biden Administration, AFR has pushed for the appointment of progressives to federal office. The group praised the nomination of Saule Omarova to lead the Office of the Comptroller of the Currency (OCC).

References

Financial regulation in the United States
Non-profit organizations based in Washington, D.C.
Organizations established in 2009
2009 establishments in Washington, D.C.